Lewis Nash (born December 30, 1958) is an American jazz drummer. According to Modern Drummer magazine, Nash has one of the longest discographies in jazz and has played on over 400 records, earning him the honor of Jazz's Most Valuable Player by the magazine in its May 2009 issue.

In 2012, The Nash Jazz Club,] opened in Phoenix, AZ. Named after Lewis Nash by Jazz in AZ 501(c)(3), The Nash Jazz Club is dedicated to performances and educational programs that promote jazz education. 

In 2017, Nash joined the jazz studies faculty at Arizona State University, where he was named the Bob and Gretchen Ravenscroft Professor of Practice in Jazz. In early 2021, the Lewis Nash Scholarship Endowment was created by the university to be awarded annually to a deserving ASU undergraduate or graduate jazz performance student.

Nash is noted for his adaptability to a vast array of genres, as evidenced by his performances with such different musicians as Tommy Flanagan and Don Pullen. Nash has made 5 recordings as bandleader: Rhythm is My Business (1989), It Don't Mean a Thing (2003 Japanese import) and Stompin' at the Savoy (2005 Japanese import), Lewis Nash and the Bebop All-Stars featuring Frank Wess (2008 Japanese Import), and The Highest Mountain (2012). In 2008, Nash became part of The Blue Note 7, a septet formed that year in honor of the 70th anniversary of Blue Note Records.

Discography

As leader
 Rhythm Is My Business (Evidence, 1989)
 It Don't Mean a Thing (Pony Canyon, 2003) Japanese import
 Stompin' at the Savoy (Pony Canyon, 2005) Japanese import
 The Highest Mountain (Cellar Live/Planetworks, 2012)
 Duologue with Steve Wilson (MCG Jazz, 2014)

As sideman
With Toshiko Akiyoshi
 Four Seasons (1990)
 Remembering Bud: Cleopatra's Dream (1990)
 Chic Lady (1991)
 Hope (2005)
With Kenny Barron
Invitation (Criss Cross Jazz, 1991)
With The Blue Note 7
 Mosaic: A Celebration of Blue Note Records (Blue Note/EMI, 2009)
With Kenny Burrell
Sunup to Sundown (Contemporary, 1991)
With Benny Carter
Legends (MusicMasters, 1993)
With Ron Carter
Eight Plus (Victor (Japan), 1990)
 Mr. Bow-tie (Somethin' Else, 1995)
The Bass and I (Somethin' Else, 1997)
 So What? (Somethin' Else, 1998)
With Classical Jazz Quartet
 Tchaikovsky's Nutcracker (Vertical, 2001)
 The Classical Jazz Quartet Plays Bach (Vertical, 2002)
 The Classical Jazz Quartet Play Rachmaninov (Kind of Blue, 2006)
 The Classical Jazz Quartet Play Tchaikovsky (Vertical, 2006)
 Christmas (Kind of Blue, 2006)
With Roni Ben-Hur
 Fortuna (2008)
With Tommy Flanagan
 Beyond the Blue Bird (Timeless, 1990)
 Flanagan's Shenanigans (Storyville, 1993) 
 Let's Play the Music of Thad Jones (Enja, 1993)
 Lady Be Good ... For Ella (Groovin' High, 1993)
 Sea Changes (Alfa, 1996)
 Sunset and the Mockingbird (Blue Note, 1997)
With Frank Foster
Leo Rising (Arabesque, 1997)
With Dizzy Gillespie
 Bird Songs: The Final Recordings (Telarc, 1992)
 To Bird with Love (Telarc, 1992)
With Sir Roland Hanna
Milano, Paris, New York: Finding John Lewis (Venus, 2002)
With Jimmy Heath
 Little Man Big Band (Verve, 1992)
With Eddie Henderson
 Inspiration (Milestone, 1994)
With Joe Lovano
 Tenor Legacy (Blue Note, 1993)
 Quartets: Live at the Village Vanguard (Blue Note, 1995)
 52nd Street Themes (Blue Note, 2000)
 Classic! Live at Newport (Blue Note, 2016)
With Branford Marsalis
 Random Abstract (Columbia, 1987)
With Pat Martino
 Think Tank (Blue Note, 2003)
With Charles McPherson
Come Play with Me (Arabesque, 1995)
With Mulgrew Miller
 Hand in Hand (1992)
With Tete Montoliu
The Man from Barcelona (Timeless, 1990)
With Frank Morgan
A Lovesome Thing (Antilles, 1991)
With David "Fathead" Newman
 Mr. Gentle Mr. Cool (Kokopelli, 1994)
With Houston Person
Mellow (HighNote, 2009)
So Nice (HighNote, 2011)
Naturally (HighNote, 2012)
Nice 'n' Easy (HighNote, 2013)
The Melody Lingers On (HighNote, 2014)
Something Personal (HighNote, 2015)
With Chris Potter
Presenting Chris Potter (Criss Cross Jazz, 1993)
With Don Pullen
 Random Thoughts (Blue Note, 1990)
With Renee Rosnes
 Black Narcissus (2009)
With Clark Terry
 Portraits (1989) with Don Friedman, Victor Gaskin
With Toots Thielemans
 Footprints (EmArcy, 1989)
With McCoy Tyner
 Illuminations (2004)
With Cedar Walton
 Roots (Astor Place, 1997)
With Larry Willis
How Do You Keep the Music Playing? (SteepleChase, 1992)
With Gerald Wilson
 New York, New Sound (Mack Avenue, 2003)
 In My Time (Mack Avenue, 2005)
 Monterey Moods (Mack Avenue, 2007)
 Detroit (Mack Avenue, 2009)
 Legacy (Mack Avenue, 2011)
With Saori Yano
 Little Tiny (Nippon Columbia, 2007)
With Dee Dee Bridgewater
 Eleanora Fagan (1915-1959): To Billie with Love from Dee Dee Bridgewater (EmArcy, 2010)
'With Jane Monheit
 Taking a Chance on Love'' (Sony Music Entertainment, 2004)

References 

1958 births
American jazz drummers
Living people
Grammy Award winners
Musicians from Phoenix, Arizona
20th-century American drummers
American male drummers
20th-century American male musicians
American male jazz musicians
The Blue Note 7 members
Classical Jazz Quartet members